Secrets of the Gods (re-released in theatres under the title The Force Beyond in 1977) is a 1977 American satirical documentary film directed by William Sachs.

Plot

Cast
 Donn Davison (hosted by)
 Rosko (narrated by)
 Orson Welles (archive footage, as himself)

Quotes

See also
 List of American films of 1976
 List of American films of 1978

References

External links

1977 films
1977 documentary films
American independent films
Films based on urban legends
1977 independent films
American documentary films
1970s English-language films
Films directed by William Sachs
1970s American films